The Toyota J is a series of overhead valve diesel engines built by Toyota, mainly for truck applications, beginning in March 1964 and ending in 1983.

J 
The J is a  inline-four, eight valve OHV diesel engine. It was introduced in March 1964. Bore and stroke is 88.0 by 96.0 mm, the compression ratio is 18.5 : 1.

Applications
 Toyota Dyna JK170
 Toyota Light Bus JK170B

2J
The 2J is a  inline-four, eight valve OHV diesel engine. It was first introduced in 1969 and was built until 1983. Later versions claim  at the same engine speed.

Applications
 Toyota ToyoAce JY16
 Toyota 700kg Shovel Loader SD7 (50 PS)

References

J
Diesel engines by model
Straight-four engines